Dragstrip Girl is a 1994 American drama film directed by Mary Lambert.

Dragstrip Girl originally aired on the cable television network Showtime on September 2, 1994 as part of the anthology series, Rebel Highway. As with other films in the series its name is taken from a 1950s B-movie (Dragstrip Girl) but its plot bears no resemblance to that film.

Plot
Johnny is a bad guy trying to go straight. He becomes smitten with Laura, a wealthy good girl rebelling against her parents by pretending to go steady with him. This film is set against the backdrop of 1950s Los Angeles.

Cast
 Mark Dacascos as Johnny Ramirez
 Natasha Gregson Wagner as Laura Bickford
 María Celedonio as Pearl
 Christopher Crabb as Alex
 Raymond Cruz as Doogie
 Frederick Coffin as Mr. Bickford
 Traci Lords as Blanche
 Richard Portnow as Det. Dryden
 Tracy Wells as Megan
 Augusto Sandino as Anthony
 Adam Gifford as Evan
 Carolyn Mignini as Mrs. Bickford
 Gary Werntz as McCarthy
 Luis Contrera as Raoul
 Bill A. Jones as Mr. Jones

Reception
In a review for The A.V. Club, reviewer Nathan Rabin wrote that "the film has dreamy, ethereal atmosphere to spare, but Lambert and screenwriter Jerome Gary fail to fill their evocative '50s dreamscape with sympathetic or interesting characters."

References

External links 

1990s exploitation films
American auto racing films
Drag racing
Rebel Highway
1994 television films
Films directed by Mary Lambert
Films scored by Hummie Mann
American drama television films
1994 drama films
1994 films
Films produced by Debra Hill
1990s English-language films
1990s American films